The 2022 NXT In Your House was the 30th In Your House professional wrestling event produced by WWE, and the third annual held for the promotion's NXT brand division. It took place on Saturday, June 4, 2022, at the WWE Performance Center in Orlando, Florida and aired on WWE's livestreaming platforms.

In June 2020, WWE revived In Your House as a subseries of the NXT TakeOver series. In September 2021, however, the TakeOver series was discontinued after NXT reverted to being WWE's developmental territory. With the scheduling of this 2022 event, In Your House became its own event for NXT. Unlike the previous year's event, which also aired on pay-per-view (PPV), the 2022 event was only available via livestreaming, as beginning with Stand & Deliver in April, NXT's major events no longer air on PPV.

Eight matches were contested at the event, including two dark matches that were later streamed on Level Up. All five championships exclusive to the NXT brand were contested for; two were lost while the other three were retained. In the main event, Bron Breakker defeated Joe Gacy to retain the NXT Championship. In other prominent matches, The Creed Brothers (Brutus Creed and Julius Creed) defeated Pretty Deadly (Elton Prince and Kit Wilson) to win the NXT Tag Team Championship, Carmelo Hayes defeated Cameron Grimes to win the NXT North American Championship, and in the opening bout, The D'Angelo Family (Tony D'Angelo, Channing "Stacks" Lorenzo, and Troy "Two Dimes" Donovan) defeated Legado Del Fantasma (Santos Escobar, Cruz Del Toro, and Joaquin Wilde).

Production

Background
In Your House was a series of monthly pay-per-view (PPV) shows that were held by WWE from May 1995 to February 1999. They aired when the promotion was not holding one of its then-five major PPVs (WrestleMania, King of the Ring, SummerSlam, Survivor Series, and Royal Rumble), and were sold at a lower cost. The branding was retired following February 1999's St. Valentine's Day Massacre: In Your House event, as the company moved to install permanent names for each of its monthly PPVs. After 21 years, In Your House was revived in 2020 for WWE's NXT brand as a subseries of the NXT TakeOver series, being held annually in June. In September 2021, however, the TakeOver series was discontinued after NXT was rebranded as NXT 2.0, reverting the brand to being WWE's developmental territory. Despite TakeOver's discontinuation, the announcement of the 2022 event confirmed that In Your House would continue on as NXT's annual June event. It was scheduled to be held on Saturday, June 4, 2022, at NXT's home base of the WWE Performance Center in Orlando, Florida. It was the 30th event in the In Your House chronology and the third held under the NXT banner. Unlike the previous year, which also aired on traditional pay-per-view, the 2022 event was only available to livestream on Peacock in the United States and the WWE Network in international markets.

Storylines

The card included matches that resulted from scripted storylines, where wrestlers portrayed heroes, villains, or less distinguishable characters in scripted events that built tension and culminated in a wrestling match or series of matches. Results were predetermined by WWE's writers on the NXT brand, while storylines were produced on the weekly television program, NXT, and the supplementary online streaming show, Level Up.

At the NXT special Spring Breakin' on May 3, Bron Breakker defeated Joe Gacy to retain the NXT Championship. Following the match, however, Breakker was attacked by hooded minions under the command of Gacy before being carried out of the building on a stretcher by the henchmen and dumped on the side of a road. The following week, Gacy offered an invitation to Breakker to join his movement. On the May 17 episode of NXT, Breakker declined. Gacy then offered Breakker a rematch for the title, adding the stipulation that Breakker would lose the title if he was disqualified due to him not being able to control his anger, making the match official for In Your House.

During the NXT Stand & Deliver Kickoff pre-show, Wendy Choo cost Toxic Attraction (Gigi Dolin and Jacy Jayne) the NXT Women's Tag Team Championship. However, on the following episode of NXT, Dolin and Jayne won back the titles, due to NXT Women's Champion and Toxic Attraction leader Mandy Rose preventing interference from Choo. In the coming weeks, Choo kept targeting the stable, including an unsuccessful attempt at winning the NXT Women's Tag Team Championship. On the May 24 episode of NXT, after Choo attacked Rose after the latter's match, Rose accepted Choo's challenge for an NXT Women's Championship match, which was scheduled for In Your House in a Women's Championship Summit the next week.

At NXT Stand & Deliver, Carmelo Hayes lost the NXT North American Championship to Cameron Grimes in a five-way ladder match. At Spring Breakin', Hayes failed to win the title in a triple threat match also involving Solo Sikoa, who Grimes pinned to retain the title. On the following episode of NXT, Sikoa wanted another shot at the title, and Grimes said that he would get the match after Grimes defeated Hayes at In Your House. The next day, a match between Grimes and Hayes for the title was made official for In Your House.

On May 15, Pretty Deadly (Kit Wilson and Elton Prince) were scheduled to defend the NXT Tag Team Championship against The Creed Brothers (Brutus Creed and Julius Creed) at In Your House. Wilson and Prince last eliminated The Creed Brothers in a gauntlet match to win the vacant titles on the April 12 episode of NXT. On the May 31 episode of NXT, a further stipulation was added in that The Creed Brothers must leave Diamond Mine should they lose.

In April, Legado Del Fantasma (Santos Escobar, Cruz Del Toro, Elektra Lopez, and Joaquin Wilde) began feuding with Tony D'Angelo, the self-proclaimed "Don of NXT" and his "family". On the April 26 episode of NXT, D'Angelo revealed his associates to be Channing "Stacks" Lorenzo and Troy "Two Dimes" Donovan, after they cost D'Angelo his match. At Spring Breakin', D'Angelo and Escobar agreed to an uneasy truce. The following week, Escobar stated that AJ Galante was fair game in the war due to his interference in the peace talks. D'Angelo responded by kidnapping Toro in his car trunk and leaving the Performance Center. A match between Escobar and D'Angelo was scheduled for the May 17 episode. During the match, a brawl between Toro, Wilde, Lorenzo, and Donovan occurred at ringside, which allowed Escobar to strike D'Angelo with brass knuckles and give Escobar the win. The following week, after Donovan and Lorenzo's match, the two teams brawled. On the May 31 episode, the two teams agreed to a six-man tag team match at In Your House where the losing team would join the winning team's stable.

Reception
Cameron Grimes vs Carmelo Hayes and Legado Del Fantasma vs Channing "Stacks", Tony, and Troy both received 3.75 stars, the highest of the night. The lowest rated match of the night was Mandy Rose vs Wendy Choo, which received 1.5 stars. Elsewhere, the women's tag title match received 2.75 stars, Pretty Deadly vs The Creeds received 2.75 stars and the main event received the same rating as the Pretty Deadly match.

Aftermath
New NXT North American Champion Carmelo Hayes, with Trick Williams, opened the following episode of NXT, but was quickly interrupted by Solo Sikoa, who wanted a shot at the title. Grayson Waller interrupted, stating that nobody likes Sikoa, which is why they called him "Solo". Waller, Hayes, and Williams then laid out Sikoa, leading to a 2-on-1 handicap match pitting Sikoa against Waller and Hayes being scheduled for that episode's main event. However, after making his NXT return earlier that night, Apollo Crews teamed with Sikoa to defeat Waller and Hayes.

With Legado Del Fantasma (Santos Escobar, Cruz Del Toro, Joaquin Wilde, and Elektra Lopez) joining The D'Angelo Family (Tony D'Angelo, Channing "Stacks" Lorenzo, and Troy "Two Dimes" Donovan), they would accompany each other during matches with them usually losing. On the following episode of NXT, Escobar lost his match after he didn't want to use his crowbar against his opponent. On the June 21 episode (taped June 8), Escobar cost D'Angelo his NXT North American Championship match. This was Donovan's final WWE appearance, as he was released on June 12 due to a policy violation. On the June 28 episode, he was written off television when D'Angelo threw him off the bridge and into the water. D'Angelo thought that Donovan tried to steal his throne. At NXT: The Great American Bash on July 5, D'Angelo revealed that Escobar was hospitalized and the other members of Legado began working with The D'Angelo Family. Escobar returned on the August 2 episode of NXT, where he cost Lorenzo and D'Angelo their NXT Tag Team Championship match, signaling that their alliance has ended. A street fight between D'Angelo and Escobar was later scheduled for Heatwave, where D'Angelo won to end the feud and, as per the match stipulation, Escobar and the rest of Legado agreed to leave NXT if that happened.

Results

References

External links 
 

2022 WWE Network events
June 2022 events in the United States
WWE NXT
In Your House
Events in Orlando, Florida
Professional wrestling in Orlando, Florida
2022 in professional wrestling in Florida